The Mixed 4 × 100 metre freestyle relay competition of the 2018 European Aquatics Championships was held on 8 August 2018.

Records
Prior to the competition, the existing world and championship records were as follows.

The following new records were set during this competition.

Results

Heats
The heats were started at 10:01.

Final
The final was started at 17:45.

References

Mixed 4 x 100 metre freestyle relay
European